Sir Stephen Patrick O'Rahilly  (born 1 April 1958) is an Irish-British physician and scientist known for his research into the molecular pathogenesis of human obesity, insulin resistance and related metabolic and endocrine disorders.

Education
O'Rahilly was born in Dublin, Ireland and educated at Beneavin College. He attended University College Dublin to study medicine.

Research
O'Rahilly undertook research into Type 2 diabetes and insulin resistance at the University of Oxford and Harvard Medical School, before joining the University of Cambridge where he is a Professor of Clinical Biochemistry and Medicine, Director of the Wellcome-MRC Institute of Metabolic Science-Metabolic Research Laboratories, Director of the MRC Metabolic Diseases Unit and co-director of the Wellcome-MRC Institute of Metabolic Science.  He is also the scientific Director of the National Institute for Health and Care Research (NIHR) Cambridge Biomedical Research Centre, Associate Faculty at the Wellcome Trust Sanger Institute and honorary consultant physician at Addenbrooke's Hospital, Cambridge.  He is a professorial fellow of Pembroke College, Cambridge.

Notable Cambridge scientists with whom O'Rahilly has shared paper authorship include  Krishna Chatterjee, David Dunger, Sadaf Farooqi, Nita Forouhi, Antonio Vidal-Puig, Nick Wareham, and Giles Yeo,

Awards and honours
O'Rahilly was elected to the Academy of Medical Sciences in 1999, the Royal Society in 2003. His nomination reads:  O'Rahilly became a Foreign Associate of the National Academy of Sciences, in the US in 2011. He was awarded the Heinrich Wieland Prize in 2002, the InBev-Baillet Latour Health Prize in 2010 and the Debrecen Award for Molecular Medicine in 2014. He delivered the 2016 Harveian Oration at the Royal College of Physicians of London.

O'Rahilly was knighted in the 2013 Birthday Honours for services to medical research.

In 2017 he became a member of the Royal Irish Academy. In 2018, he was made an Honorary Doctor of RCSI University of Medicine and Health Sciences in Dublin.

In 2019, O'Rahilly was elected as an Honorary Fellow of the Learned Society of Wales (LSW).  He was also awarded the Banting Medal for his contributions towards diabetes research by the American Diabetes Association in the same year.  

O'Rahilly was awarded the Croonian Medal in 2011 by the Royal College of Physicians. He was awarded it again, by the Royal Society in 2022, this time jointly with Sadaf Farooqi and they presented their lecture  at the Royal Society in 2022.

Personal life
O’Rahilly lives in Cambridge, England with his wife, journalist Philippa Lamb, and his stepson Felix Lamb. He was married to Suzy Oakes from 1990 until her death in 2011.

He holds dual Irish and British citizenship.

References

1958 births
Living people
People from County Dublin
Irish diabetologists
Foreign associates of the National Academy of Sciences
Knights Bachelor
Fellows of the Academy of Medical Sciences (United Kingdom)
Fellows of the Royal College of Physicians
Fellows of the Royal College of Pathologists
Fellows of the Royal Society
NIHR Senior Investigators
Irish expatriates in the United Kingdom
20th-century Irish medical doctors
21st-century Irish medical doctors
20th-century British medical doctors
21st-century British medical doctors
Fellows of Pembroke College, Cambridge
Alumni of University College Dublin
Fellows of the Royal College of Physicians of Ireland
Members of the Royal Irish Academy